Kevin Potter (born December 19, 1959) is a former American football defensive back. He played for the Chicago Bears from 1983 to 1984.

References

1959 births
Living people
American football defensive backs
Missouri Tigers football players
Chicago Bears players